Single-letter second-level domains are domains in which the second-level domain of the domain name consists of only one letter, such as X.com. In 1993, the Internet Assigned Numbers Authority (IANA) explicitly reserved all single-letter and single-digit second-level domains under the top-level domains com, net, and org, and grandfathered those that had already been assigned. In December 2005, ICANN considered auctioning these domain names.

Active single-letter domains
On December 1, 1993, the Internet Assigned Numbers Authority (IANA) explicitly reserved the remaining single-letter and single-digit domain names. The few domains that were already assigned were grandfathered in and continued to exist.

The six single-letter domains in existence at that time under .com, .net and .org were the following:

The .org TLD was subsequently reopened for single-letter domain registrations. These and selected other gTLD and ccTLD single-letter domain names currently in use, typically as shortcuts, are listed below.

Many other single-letter second-level domains have been registered under country code top-level domains. The list of country code top-level domains which have been identified to allow single-letter domains are:

 .ac
 .af
 .ag
 .ai
 .am
 .bo
 .by
 .bz
 .cm
 .cn
 .co
 .cr
 .cx
 .cz
 .de
 .dk
 .fm
 .gd
 .gg
 .gl
 .gp
 .gs
 .gt
 .gy
 .hn
 .hr
 .ht
 .ie<ref>One and Two Letter .IE Domains Now Available "The release of short .ie domain names " Dublin, 12 October 2015</ref>
 .im
 .io
 .is
 .je
 .kg
 .ki
 .kw
 .la
 .lb
 .lc
 .ly
 .md
 .mg
 .mk
 .mp
 .ms
 .mw
 .mx
 .mu
 .nf
 .np
 .nz
 .pe
 .ph
 .pk
 .pl
 .pn
 .pr
 .pw
 .ro
 .sh
 .st
 .tc
 .tl
 .tt
 .to
 .tv
 .ua
 .vc
 .vg
 .vn
 .vu
 .ws

Non-ASCII single-character domains
Single-character non-ASCII second-level domains also exist (as seen below), also known as Internationalized domain names (IDN), these domains are actually registered as their Punycode translations (which are more than a single character) for DNS purposes. ICANN oversees a process for determining registration rules that involves wide-ranging stakeholder input and assorted Working Groups. In the case of .com domains, decisions are then implemented by Verisign, the contracted backend operator for the .com registry. The result is a list of 96,957 codepoints allowed for IDN registrations. As mentioned above, some additional domains previously-registered are "grandfathered" and remain active. Many gTLDs also allow IDN registration.

These 96,957 distinct IDN characters eligible for registration in .com are the essential building-blocks of languages worldwide. A single letter domain does not provide the context found in a longer string or group of words. They may appear similar to one another or to other English / Latin characters; due to this potential for confusion, browsers have restricted the characters that may be rendered and will display the restricted characters in their Punycode form. They are sometimes used as pictorial symbols and memorable links.

Project94
In 2012, the Public Interest Registry (PIR) initiated Project94, in which 94 one- and two-letter domains in the top-level domain org, that had been traditionally reserved, are awarded to qualifying organizations.

Market value of single- or two-letter domains
Only three of the 26 possible single-letter domains have ever been registered under the .com domain, all before 1992. The other 23 single-letter .com domain names were registered January 1, 1992 by Jon Postel, with the intention to avoid a single company commercially controlling a letter of the alphabet. Many but not all .com two-letter domain names are among the most valuable domain names.

While it is widely believed that the domain names business.com and sex.com have been the most valuable domain name transactions, prominent two-letter domain names have only been sold after nondisclosed transactions handled by specialized broker and law firms.

The value of the LG Corp (the South Korean electronics conglomerate formerly known as Lucky-Goldstar) purchase of LG.com was never published. LG Group missed the first sale of the domain name in 2008 from the original owner the chemical company Lockwood Greene to the dot-com entrepreneur Andy Booth; Booth had used it to launch a footballing website known as LifeGames. LG Corp bought "lg.com" one year later, in 2009. Following the purchase, LG Group changed worldwide marketing to LG.com, which is now their central internet address for all countries. All national LG country domain names like "LG.de" or "LG.com.mx" redirect to "LG.com".

The value of the initially secret November 2010 Facebook purchase of FB.com was revealed two months later to be $8.5 million in cash and the rest in stocks.

IG Group paid $4.7 million in September 2013 to buy IG.com.

GMO Internet, Inc. purchased Z.com for nearly $6.8 million from Nissan, who previously used it for the Nissan Z series cars.

Controversy
With the 2005 announcement that registration of the remaining single-letter names might become available, some companies have attempted to establish a right to the names by claiming trademark rights over single letters used in such a context. U'' magazine, a college-oriented publication, went so far as to rebrand its website as "U.com" and apply for a trademark registration of the same phrase, before sending a letter to ICANN attempting to gain priority for the domain if it should ever become available in the future.

References

External links
 ICANN - Reserved domain names
 Icann Blog Internet Corporation for Assigned Names and Numbers
 Web's hottest real estate could go on sale, an Associated Press article about the possible release of one letter .coms written in 2005.

Single-letter

URL-shortening services